Brightest Star is the debut mini-album from J-pop vocal group Bright. This was their first CD released under major label Rhythm Zone. The album ranked weekly on the Oricon chart at No. 133.

Track listing 
Theme of Bright
Brightest Star
Girls Party Time
Eternal Love
Tears
Orenji (オレンジ; Orange)

DVD Track list
Brightest Star Music Video

References

2008 EPs
Avex Group EPs
Bright (Japanese band) EPs
Japanese-language EPs